Elizaville Presbyterian Church is a historic church on Kentucky Route 32 in Elizaville, Kentucky.  It was built in 1861 and added to the National Register of Historic Places in 1977.

It is a Flemish-bond brick front-gabled building which had an octagonal tower and spire over its entrance.

See also
National Register of Historic Places listings in Kentucky

References

Presbyterian churches in Kentucky
Churches on the National Register of Historic Places in Kentucky
Churches completed in 1861
19th-century Presbyterian church buildings in the United States
1861 establishments in Kentucky
National Register of Historic Places in Fleming County, Kentucky
Greek Revival church buildings in Kentucky